The Last Trail is a 1921 American silent Western film directed by Emmett J. Flynn and starring Maurice 'Lefty' Flynn, Eva Novak and  Wallace Beery. It is based on the 1909 novel The Last Trail by Zane Grey.

Cast
 Maurice 'Lefty' Flynn as The Stranger 
 Eva Novak as Winifred Samson
 Wallace Beery as William Kirk
 Rosemary Theby as Chiquita
 Charles K. French as Sheriff Nelson
 Harry Spingler as Campbell
 Harry Dunkinson as Kenworth Samson

References

Bibliography
 Connelly, Robert B. The Silents: Silent Feature Films, 1910-36, Volume 40, Issue 2. December Press, 1998.
 Munden, Kenneth White. The American Film Institute Catalog of Motion Pictures Produced in the United States, Part 1. University of California Press, 1997.

External links
 

1921 films
1921 Western (genre) films
American silent feature films
Silent American Western (genre) films
American black-and-white films
1920s English-language films
Films directed by Emmett J. Flynn
Fox Film films
1920s American films